Porchefontaine is a neighborhood in the south-east of Versailles, in Yvelines department of France.

It was a working class residential area.  Since the 1970s, the working class has been replaced by white-collar workers.

It has two schools, a sports centre, and a small downtown and its green area is part of the forests of Versailles, Satory and Meudon.

Versailles